Lin Yilin (born 1964) is a Chinese performance artist.

Biography
Lin was born in Guangzhou, Guangdong, China in 1964. He completed his undergraduate education at Guangzhou Academy of Fine Arts and graduated in 1987. Lin's work is typically site-specific and especially crafted for the place of its performance.

Lin was a core member and co-founder of the Big Tail Elephant Group, a Guangzhou-based performance and intervention based artist collective with an interest in urban development. His work from this time aims to address the rapid urbanization and economic growth seen in China during the 1990s. Lin used bricks as a motif and sculptural object to further call out these themes. One of his most notable works from this period is Safely Maneuvering across Linhe Road (1995) in which Lin moved a wall of concrete blocks across a busy street in Guangzhou, interrupting the flow of traffic.

In 2001, Lin moved to New York City. As a result his interest in globalization has expanded beyond China. His practice continues to be centered on performance. His 2018 three-part work Monad, commissioned for the Solomon R. Guggenheim Museum's permanent collection, through VR, allows viewers to inhabit NBA player Jeremy Lin. Lin attributes Jeremy Lin as being a "key figure in representations of race."

Lin now divides his time between New York and Beijing.

References

External links 
https://www.mutualart.com/Artist/Lin-Yilin/470859B4E56F9A54
https://theculturetrip.com/north-america/usa/new-york/articles/the-guggenheim-selects-five-influential-chinese-artists-for-new-commissions/
http://www.aaa-a.org/programs/lin-yilin-in-conversation-with-gianni-jetzer/
 

1964 births
Living people
Artists from Guangzhou
Guangzhou Academy of Fine Arts alumni
Chinese performance artists
Chinese expatriates in the United States